The 1960 Winter Universiade, the I Winter Universiade, took place in Chamonix, France.

Medal table

Alpine Skiing
Men: Slalom 
Gold – Walther Herwig (Switzerland) 
Silver – Sbynek Mohr (Czechoslovakia) 
Bronze – Bernard Cottet (France)

Men: Giant Slalom 
Gold – Philippe Stern (Switzerland) 
Silver – Walther Herwig (Switzerland) 
Bronze – Klaus Herwig (Switzerland)

Men: Downhill 
Gold – Manfred Köstinger (Austria) 
Silver – Walter Kutschera (Austria) 
Bronze – Heinz Gallob (Austria)

Men: Combined 
Combined event is the overall standings of all disciplines on the Universiade program. 
Gold – Heinz Gallob (Austria) 
Silver – Pier Giorgio Vigliani (Italy) 
Bronze – Peter Lakota (Yugoslavia)

Women: Slalom 
Gold – Cécile Prince (France) 
Silver – Marie-José Dusonchet (France) 
Bronze – Trandl Legat (Austria)

Women: Downhill 
Gold – Marie-José Dusonchet (France) 
Silver – Gertraud Gaber (Austria) 
Bronze – Franca Quaglia (Italy)

Women: Combined 
Combined event is the overall standings of all disciplines on the Universiade program. 
Gold – Marie-José Dusonchet (France) 
Silver – Cécile Prince (France) 
Bronze – Gertraud Gaber (Austria)

Nordic Skiing
Men: 4 x 8 km Relay 
Gold – Soviet Union 
Silver – Czechoslovakia 
Bronze – Poland

Women: 3 x 4 km Relay 
Gold – Soviet Union 
Silver – Czechoslovakia 
Bronze – Poland

Nordic Combined
Small Hill Ski Jumping and 15km Cross-Country

Men: 
Gold – Jaromir Nevlud (Czechoslovakia) 
Silver – Albert Larinov (Soviet Union) 
Bronze – Yuriy Krestov (Soviet Union)

Ski JumpingMen: Small Hill - K90 
Gold – Albert Larinov (Soviet Union) 
Silver – Jaromir Nevlud (Czechoslovakia) 
Bronze – Milan Rojina (Yugoslavia)

Figure SkatingMen: 
Gold – Alain Calmat (France) 
Silver – Nobuo Sato (Japan) 
Bronze – Heinrich Podhaisky (Austria)Women:''' 
Gold – Jitka Hlaváčková (Czechoslovakia) 
Silver – Eva Grozajová (Czechoslovakia) 
Bronze – Helga Zollner (Hungary)

1960
1960 in multi-sport events
1960 in French sport
International sports competitions hosted by France
Multi-sport events in France
Sport in Haute-Savoie
February 1960 sports events in Europe
March 1960 sports events in Europe
Universiade 1960